Gravelly Point is an area within the National Park Service's George Washington Memorial Parkway in Arlington County, Virginia, in the United States. It is located on the west side of the Potomac River, north of Roaches Run and Ronald Reagan Washington National Airport.

The paved Mount Vernon Trail travels through the area. A rugby pitch hosts high school rugby matches. The area also has a boat launch and a Capital Bikeshare dock.

Gravelly Point is a popular spot for plane spotters and others to watch planes take off and land from Reagan National Airport. Airplanes pass between 100 and 200 feet overhead when landing on Runway 19 or taking off from Runway 1.

History
In 1746, a house and property near Gravelly Point were owned by Gerrard Alexander, whose family were the namesakes of Alexandria, Virginia. In 1778, the house was part of a slave-tilled farm named Abingdon, and was purchased by John Parke Custis, the son of Martha Washington and stepson of George Washington. Martha Washington's granddaughter Eleanor Parke Custis was later born on the farm.  

In 1930, a house at Abingdon was destroyed by fire and its ruins stabilized.

Proposed renaming 
Since 2016, Rep. Jody Hice (R-GA-10) has introduced four unsuccessful bills in the United States House of Representatives to rename Gravelly Point as Nancy Reagan Memorial Park. H.R. 5457, introduced in 2016, was referred by the House Committee on Natural Resources to a subcommittee and proceeded no further. H.R. 553, introduced in 2017, received approval from the Natural Resources Committee on January 17, 2018, in a party-line vote but saw no further action. H.R. 308, introduced in 2019, was referred by the Natural Resources Committee to a subcommittee which took no further action. H.R. 4364, introduced in 2021, was referred by the Natural Resources Committee to a subcommittee and has seen no further action .

External links

 George Washington Memorial Parkway
 BikeWashington.org directions on how to access Gravelly Point via bicycle

References

George Washington Memorial Parkway
Parks in Arlington County, Virginia
Potomac River
Virginia municipal and county parks
Rugby union stadiums in Washington, D.C.